Juda Huay Kuch Is Tarah is a Pakistani drama serial produced by Momina Duraid under banner of MD Productions. It features Dur-e-Fishan Saleem and Nabeel Zuberi in lead roles. It aired weekdays (Monday - Friday) on Hum TV at 9pm from 23 August 2021 to 8 October 2021 and completed 31 episodes within two and a half months and was replaced by Duraid's another production, Sila-e-Mohabbat.

The serial received backlash for portraying the marriage of foster siblings (not siblings in accordance with plotline) as it is unlawful in Islam.

Plot
Before her death, Maha's mother wants to meet Asad, her sister's son whom she had brought up. Maha's father tries to contact Najeeb (Asad's father), and explains him the situation of Maha's mother who is on deathbed. Asad along with his father reaches Karachi and visit his Aunt. Najeeb thinks that Khadija has done soany favours on him by bringing up of Asad, thus he decides to return her favours and convinces Asad to merry Maha. Consequently, their Nikkah happens......

Controversy 
Juda Huay Kuch Is Tarhan sparked controversy when a trailer of one of the episodes was released which revealed the plot that Asad and Maha are siblings and they cannot be married.oh

Cast 
 Dur-e-Fishan Saleem Maha 
 Nabeel Zuberi as Asad 
 Sabeena Syed as Zara
 Hasan Khan as Faizan
 Shabbir Jan as Tariq
 Fareeda Shabbir as Erum
 Kashif Mehmood as Najeeb
 Sohail Sameer as Javed
 Salma Hassan as Khadija
 Saima Qureshi as Maria
 Aimen Shehzadi as Samar
 Salma Qadir as Sughra

Production
The working title of the series was Nibah which later changed. It marked second appearance of Durr-e-Fishan and Nabeel Zuberi after Dil Ruba.

References 

2020s Pakistani television series
Pakistani drama television series
2021 Pakistani television series debuts
Hum TV original programming